= Juvenile Scientific Pictorial =

- Type: Popular science magazine
- Founded: January 1979
- Language: Chinese
- Headquarters: Beijing
- ISSN: 1000-7776
- OCLC number: 958417433

Juvenile Scientific Pictorial
- Traditional Chinese: 少年科學畫報
- Simplified Chinese: 少年科学画报
Transcriptions
Standard Mandarin
- Hanyu Pinyin: Shàonián kēxué huàbào

The Juvenile Scientific Pictorial (simplified Chinese: 少年科学画报; traditional Chinese: 少年科學畫報; pinyin: Shàonián kēxué huàbào), or Children's Science Pictorial, Scientific Pictorial for Young People, is a juvenile popular science comic magazine published in Chinese launched in January 1979 and based in Beijing. The ISSN number of the publication is ISSN 1000-7776.

Juvenile Scientific Pictorial is the illustrated popular science magazine for children and teenagers in the People's Republic of China, suitable for elementary school students from grade 1 to 6, and is published once a month.

== History ==
Juvenile Scientific Pictorial was presented by Beijing Publishing House Publishing Group. In 2003, a new color printing of the publication was brought out.
